Loring McMillen (March 10, 1906 – March 19, 1991) was Staten Island's official historian who preserved the works of Alice Austen and worked to restore Historic Richmond Town.

Biography
He was born in Staten Island on March 10, 1906. He attended Union College in Schenectady, New York, and he took courses in architecture at Columbia University. In 1928 he went to work for  Bell Telephone, designing cable tracks and cable conduits until retiring in 1966. He became Staten Island's official historian in 1934. He died on March 19, 1991, in Richmondtown, at age 85. He was succeeded as Staten Island Borough Historian by Richard B. Dickenson.

Awards
Cornelius Amory Pugsley Local Medal Award from the American Academy for Park and Recreation Administration (1955)

References

1906 births
1991 deaths
Engineers from New York City
People from Richmondtown, Staten Island
Historians of New York City
Curtis High School alumni
20th-century American historians
American male non-fiction writers
20th-century American engineers
Historians from New York (state)
History of Staten Island
20th-century American male writers